Sikhumbuzo Thabo Mabuza (born 1 February 1994 in Nelspruit, South Africa) is a South African rugby union player for the  in the Currie Cup and the Rugby Challenge. He generally plays as an openside flanker.

Career

Youth

In 2010, he represented them at the Under-16 Grant Khomo Week in Upington and he played for them in the Under-18 Craven Week tournament in both 2011 and 2012.

In both seasons, he was also selected for the South African Schools side. In 2011, he played in a 21–14 victory against a France Under-18 side in Port Elizabeth and in 2012, he started in three matches – against France, Wales and England Under-18.

In 2014, Mabuza was included in the South Africa Under-20 squad for the 2014 IRB Junior World Championship to be held in New Zealand.

Golden Lions

Mabuza had a remarkable start to his first class career. The Leopards led 16–3 shortly before the hour mark when Mabuza scored two tries in a four-minute spell to bring the Golden Lions back into the game and eventually helped them narrowly win the match 18–16.

References

South African rugby union players
Living people
1994 births
People from Mbombela
Golden Lions players
Rugby union flankers
South Africa Under-20 international rugby union players
Rugby union players from Mpumalanga